East Honolulu is a census-designated place (CDP) located in Honolulu County, Hawaii, United States. As of the 2020 Census, the CDP had a population of 50,922, making it the 2nd most populated CDP in Hawaii, behind Honolulu.

Geography 
East Honolulu is centered on  (21.2891, -157.7173).

East Honolulu consists of the area directly east of the center of Honolulu, beginning at the Wai'alae Country Club and extending east to Makapu'u Point, the easternmost point on the island of Oahu. It consists of mostly upscale neighborhoods.

Areas:
 ʻĀina Haina
 Hawaii Kai
 Niu Valley

Demographics

Education
Hawaii Department of Education operates area public schools.

Elementary schools:
 Ana Haina Elementary School
 Haha'ione Elementary School
 Kamilo'iki Elementary School
 Koko Head Elementary School

Middle schools:
 Niu Valley Middle School

High schools:
 Henry J. Kaiser High School
Kalani High School

Private schools:
 The Roman Catholic Diocese of Honolulu maintains the Holy Nativity School
 Honolulu Waldorf School

Hawaii State Public Library System maintains the Aina Haina Public Library.

References

East Honolulu, Hawaii
Census-designated places in Honolulu County, Hawaii
Populated coastal places in Hawaii